Aïn Zerga is a town and commune in Tébessa Province in north-eastern Algeria, near the border with Tunisia.

References

Communes of Tébessa Province